Abdel Aziz Ali Abdul Majid al-Rantisi (23 October 1947 – 17 April 2004), nicknamed the "Lion of Palestine" was the co-founder of Palestinian Sunni-Islamic organization Hamas along with Sheikh Ahmed Yassin.

Rantisi was Hamas's political leader and spokesman in the Gaza Strip following the Israeli killing of Hamas spiritual leader Sheikh Ahmed Yassin in March 2004. Rantisi opposed compromise with Israel and called for the creation of a Palestinian state (including the whole of the State of Israel) through military action against the Jewish state.

On 17 April 2004, the Israeli Air Force killed al-Rantisi by firing Hellfire missiles from an AH-64 Apache helicopter at his car.

Early life and education
Rantisi was born in Yibna, near Jaffa on 23 October 1947. In the 1948 Arab-Israeli War, his family fled to the Gaza Strip. In 1956, when he was nine, Israeli soldiers killed his uncle in Khan Younis: as he explained to Joe Sacco, this fact was very important for his future life. He studied pediatric medicine and genetics at Egypt's, Alexandria University, graduating first in his class. He was a certified physician. In his time in Egypt he became a deeply convicted member of the Muslim Brotherhood. In 1976, he returned to Gaza to teach parasitology and genetics at the Islamic University.

Origins of Hamas
In 1987, four Palestinian civilians of the Jabalya refugee camp were killed in a traffic accident that involved Israeli settlers and soldiers.

According to Rantisi, he joined Sheikh Ahmad Yassin and Salah Shehadeh, among others, in instructing people to exit the mosques chanting Allahu Akbar ("God is great"). This was the start of the First Intifada, according to Rantisi, under whose leadership the organization that would subsequently come to be known as Hamas was formed later that year. "Intifada" is the Arabic word for "uprising", in this case, an uprising against the Israeli occupation. In Hamas' version of the start of the Intifada, the rival PLO later joined forces with them, and a united leadership was formed. Historians dispute the Hamas-led version of the launching of the uprising.

Expulsion and return

In December 1992, Rantissi was deported to southern Lebanon, as part of the expulsion of 416 Hamas and Palestinian Islamic Jihad operatives, and emerged as the general spokesman of the expellees. Upon his return in 1993, he was arrested, but later released. He was detained many times over longer periods by the Palestinian Authority, for his criticism of the PA and of Yasser Arafat, for the last time in mid-1999. When Rantisi returned to his public position as "right hand" to Yassin, he remained one of the main opponents to any cease-fire and cessation of attacks inside Israel.

During talks among the Hamas leadership both in Gaza and abroad and in its constant contact with the PA regarding terror activity, Rantisi, together with Ibrahim Macadma, controlled the tone of the Hamas leadership. After the return of Sheikh Yassin to the Gaza Strip in October 1997 in a prisoner exchange following a failed Israeli attempt to kill Hamas's Jordanian branch chief Khaled Mashal, Rantissi worked closely with Yassin to restore hierarchic command and to reinforce cadre uniformity within a reorganized Hamas. Following the killings of Macadma and Salah Shehadeh, Rantisi purportedly became the political head and also the acclaimed spiritual leader of Hamas, remaining its principal spokesman.

Leadership of Hamas
Rantisi's four-week tenure as leader of Hamas was spent in hiding, once the public funeral for Ahmed Yassin, attended by large crowds, ended. During his leadership, Hamas carried out a single suicide bombing that killed an Israeli policeman. On the day of his death, 17 April 2004, he came out of hiding to visit his family in Gaza City, arriving before dawn and staying till the evening. Shortly after he left the house, he was killed. Khaled Mashal became the leader of Hamas after his death.

Selected timeline
On 6 June 2003, Rantisi broke off discussions with Palestinian Authority (PA) Prime Minister Mahmoud Abbas, who had called for an end to "armed resistance".

On 8 June 2003, Rantisi was responsible for directing the Hamas-led attack in which four Israeli soldiers were killed at the Erez Checkpoint in the Gaza Strip. On 10 June 2003, Rantisi survived an Israeli helicopter attack on a car in which he was traveling. He was lightly wounded in the attack, which killed a bodyguard of Rantisi, a civilian and wounded at least 25 others.

On 26 January 2004, Rantisi offered "a 10-year truce in return for withdrawal and the establishment of a state". There had earlier been some rumored talks within Hamas about doing this but this time Rantisi announced that "the movement has decided on this".

On 23 March 2004, Rantisi was named leader of Hamas in the Gaza Strip, following the killing of Ahmed Yassin by Israeli forces. On 27 March 2004, Rantisi addressed 5,000 supporters in Gaza. He declared the then US president George W. Bush to be an "enemy of Muslims". "America declared war against God. Sharon declared war against God and God declared war against America, Bush and Sharon. The war of God continues against them and I can see the victory coming up from the land of Palestine by the hand of Hamas."

Assassination

On 17 April 2004, Rantisi was assassinated by the Israeli Air Force, when they fired Hellfire missiles from an AH-64 Apache helicopter at his car. Two others, a bodyguard named Akram Nassar and Rantisi's 27-year-old son Mohammed, were also killed in the attack, and four bystanders wounded. Israeli army radio stated that this was the first opportunity to target Rantisi, without significant collateral damage, since he took the leadership of Hamas, alleging that he had surrounded himself with human shields since the killing of Yassin.

Reactions
Israeli Foreign Ministry spokesman Jonathan Peled said:
 "Israel...today struck a mastermind of terrorism, with blood on his hands. As long as the Palestinian Authority does not lift a finger and fight terrorism, Israel will continue to have to do so itself."

British Foreign Minister Jack Straw condemned the action:
 "The British government has made it repeatedly clear that so-called 'targeted assassinations' of this kind are unlawful, unjustified and counter-productive."

Personal life
Rantisi was married to Jamila Abdallah Taha al-Shanti, who was elected to the Palestinian Legislative Council in 2006; they had six children.

Quotations
"The Israelis will not know security. We will fight them until the liberation of Palestine, the whole of Palestine."

"All the land of Palestine is a part of the Islamic faith and the Caliph Omar bin al-Khattab declared it for all Muslims. Therefore, no individual or group has the right to sell it or give it up."

"If Israel was established in Britain, would you accept compromise?", to British journalist Derek Brown, June 1993.

See also
 Hamas
 Ahmed Yassin
 List of Palestinian civilian casualties in the Second Intifada

References

External links
What the doctor orders – Interview by Amira Hass  (Haaretz)

1947 births
2004 deaths
Hamas leaders
Palestinian Muslims
Assassinated Palestinian politicians
People from the Gaza Strip
Palestinian pediatricians
Alexandria University alumni
Academic staff of the Islamic University of Gaza
Palestinian nationalists
Assassinated Hamas members
20th-century Palestinian physicians
Hamas
Hamas members